Itia is an extinct genus of sea snails, marine gastropod mollusks in the family Mitromorphidae.

Species
According to the World Register of Marine Species (WoRMS), the following species with a valid name are included within the genus Itia :
 † Itia clatrata Marwick, 1931  
Synonymized species 
 Itia benthicola Dell, 1962: synonym of Mitromorpha benthicola (Dell, 1962) (original combination)

References

 Marwick, John. The Tertiary Mollusca of the Gisborne District. Department of Scientific and Industrial Research, Geological Survey Branch, 1931.

External links
 Bouchet, P.; Kantor, Y. I.; Sysoev, A.; Puillandre, N. (2011). A new operational classification of the Conoidea (Gastropoda). Journal of Molluscan Studies. 77(3): 273-308